Hans Blum (born 23 May 1928), also known as Henry Valentino, is a German singer-songwriter known for his distinctive musical style, which has been the inspiration of a generation of German musicians. His recordings include the hit single "Im Wagen vor mir." He wrote and conducted three entries that represented Germany in the Eurovision Song Contest: "Anouschka" (performed by Inge Brück in 1967), "Primaballerina" (performed by Siw Malmkvist in 1969), and "Über die Brücke geh'n" (performed by Ingrid Peters in 1986).

Discography

Major studio albums:
 1991: Im Wagen vor mir
 1997: ...Etwas für Liebhaber
 1999: Zu Zweit Macht's Mehr Spass
 2001: Henry Valentino's Hitbox
 2004: Ich Hab' Dein Knie Geseh'n
 2006: Eine Liebe Ist Wie ein Lied

Influence
Hans Blum has been a major inspiration for a long range of German musicians and has enjoyed an extensive international recognition for the hit single "Im Wagen vor mir".

See also
List of best selling music artists

References

External links
Biography on http://www.andtheconductoris.eu/

Living people
1928 births
Musicians from Hanover
German songwriters
Eurovision Song Contest conductors
21st-century conductors (music)